The Oxfordshire Golf, Hotel & Spa is a golf resort in England, that is located  Southwest of Thame, Oxfordshire.

It is owned and operated by Leaderboard Golf Ltd.

History

The golf course was designed by American golf course architect Rees Jones, and has hosted tournaments including the Benson & Hedges International Open between 1996 and 1999, and the Brabazon Trophy in 2005.

In 2002, The Oxfordshire was bought by Leaderboard Golf Ltd., owned by Paul Gibbons. In July 2010, a new hotel and spa was opened.

Tournaments
Andersen Consulting World Championship of Golf (European section): 1995, 1996
Benson & Hedges International Open: 1996, 1997, 1998, 1999
Ladies English Open: 1995, 1996, 2008
Brabazon Trophy: 2005

References

External links
The Oxfordshire Golf Club – official site

Golf clubs and courses in Oxfordshire
Golf clubs and courses designed by Rees Jones
Hotel spas